Plon is a French book publishing company, founded in 1852 by Henri Plon and his two brothers.

History
The Éditions Plon were created in 1852, by Henri Plon and his two brothers. They were given the title of Imprimeur de l’Empereur (Imperial publisher) and published the correspondence of Louis XIII of France, Marie Antoinette and Napoleon I of France.

During the 1920s the house published the novels of the Jewish-Algerian writer Elissa Rhaïs.

Plon published Quid, an encyclopedia, from 1963 to 1974.

They were acquired by the Groupe de La Cité, which was later acquired in 1988 by Havas.

In 2001, Havas was itself absorbed by Vivendi, then called Vivendi Universal. The Vivendi group, facing financial troubles, sold several publishing companies, including Plon, to Wendel Investissement, which put it under the umbrella of the Editis group. In 2008, Editis was sold to the Spanish group Planeta.

In July 2010 the Editis Group bought Plon and the company is dissolved.

Since 2018, Sophie Charnavel directs the Plon editions.

At the end of 2018, Vivendi bought Editis for 900 million euros.

Book series
 L’Abeille PLON
 Bibliothèque PLON
 Bibliothèque reliée PLON
 Dictionnaire Amoureux
 Documents et Mémoires
 Feux Croisés
 La Nouvelle Bibliothèque PLON
 Romans
 Terre Humaine
 Tribune Libre

References

Content in this edit is translated from the existing German Wikipedia article at :fr:Plon; see its history for attribution.

External links
Official site

Book publishing companies of France
1852 establishments in France
Publishing companies established in 1852
Editis